The World Journal of Surgery is a peer-reviewed medical journal covering research in the field of surgery. It was established in 1977 and is published by Springer Science+Business Media on behalf of the International Society of Surgery, of which it is the official journal. Since July 2004, the editor-in-chief has been John G. Hunter (Oregon Health & Science University). According to the Journal Citation Reports, the journal has a 2014 impact factor of 2.642.

References

External links

Surgery journals
Publications established in 1977
Springer Science+Business Media academic journals
Academic journals associated with international learned and professional societies
English-language journals
9 times per year journals